Sciver-Brunt is a surname. Notable people with the surname include:
 Katherine Sciver-Brunt (born 1985), English cricketer
 Nat Sciver-Brunt (born 1992), English cricketer

Compound surnames